The Acorn Jersey Open was a men's senior (over 50) professional golf tournament on the European Senior Tour. It was held, under a number of different titles, from 1996 to 2010, before being played in 2015 and 2016 as the Acorn Jersey Open. It has always been played at La Moye Golf Club in Jersey. It indirectly replaced the Jersey Open, an event on the main European Tour which was staged at the same venue from 1978 to 1995.

Winners

External links
Coverage on the European Senior Tour's official site
La Moye Golf Club

Former European Senior Tour events
Golf tournaments in Jersey
Recurring sporting events established in 1996
Recurring sporting events disestablished in 2016